Chamath Palihapitiya (born 3 September 1976) is a Sri Lankan-born Canadian and American venture capitalist, engineer, SPAC sponsor, founder and CEO of Social Capital. Palihapitiya was an early senior executive at Facebook, working at the company from 2007 to 2011. Following his departure from Facebook, Palihapitiya started his fund, The Social+Capital Partnership, through which he invested in several companies, including Yammer and Slack. The Social+Capital Partnership changed its name to Social Capital in 2015. He is a co-host of the technology podcast All In.

Early life and education
Palihapitiya was born on 3 September 1976 in Sri Lanka. In 1982, Palihapitiya moved with his family to Canada at age five; his father Gamage had been posted to the High Commission of Sri Lanka, Ottawa. Five years later, in 1986, the posting came to an end, and the family applied for refugee status rather than returning home on the basis that Gamage had been criticized for his views on the violence during the Sri Lankan Civil War.

Palihapitiya's father was frequently unemployed, and his mother did low-paying housekeeping jobs. At age 14, Palihapitiya worked at a Burger King to support his family. His father died in October 2014.

He attended Lisgar Collegiate Institute. After graduating from the University of Waterloo in 1999 with a degree in electrical engineering, Palihapitiya worked for a year as a derivatives trader at the investment bank BMO Nesbitt Burns. He then accepted a job offer at Winamp and moved to California.

Career

2004–2011: Winamp, AOL, Mayfield, and Facebook 
Palihapitiya joined Winamp, which was subsequently acquired by AOL, where he became the company's youngest vice president ever, heading its instant messaging division in 2004. In 2005, he left AOL and joined Mayfield Fund; in 2007 he left Mayfield and joined Facebook, which was then a little more than three years old.

Palihapitiya's work at Facebook in the first year was messy from his account. Palihapitiya led the release of Facebook Beacon, which failed and led to lawsuits. After this failure, Palihapitiya pitched leading Growth, where his team focused entirely on new user growth. After four years, Facebook hit 1B users. Before leaving Facebook, Palihapitiya led the Facebook Phone and Facebook Home projects.

Steven Levy wrote in Facebook: The Inside Story that Palihapitiya was regarded as a "bully" at Facebook, and that he had made many of his subordinates cry regularly.

2011–present: Social Capital

Multi-LP Venture Capital Fund 

In 2011, he left Facebook and started his own fund, The Social+Capital Partnership, with his then-wife. The firm changed its name to Social Capital in 2015. Through the fund, Palihapitiya invested in a number of companies, including Glooko, Inc, Yammer, SecondMarket, Slack, and Box. As of 2015, the fund had more than $1.1 billion in total assets most of which came from external investors (i.e. LPs). 

In 2018, there was a massive decrease in Social Capital fund's operations and a significant exodus of top management and co-founders. Axios reported that Palihapitiya was spending a significant amount of time with his new girlfriend in Italy and rarely showed up to the office or answered emails from employees. The firm returned investor capital and converted into a family office although continued to manage some external capital on a no-fee basis.

In December 2019 Palihapitiya stepped down as a member of the board of directors of Slack.

Transition to Single GP Technology Holding Company 

After transitioning to a single GP firm, essentially Palihapitiya's family office, in 2018, Palihapitiya said he wanted to return to first principles and restructure the firm to better align with the long-term interests of entrepreneurs, not just limited partners (LPs).

Since then, Social Capital has made investments in three areas: climate science, life sciences, and biotechnology, and the decentralization of the digital economy through platforms such as blockchain, crypto, and digital assets. Palihapitiya manages from a balance sheet of permanent capital.

SPAC platform 
Palihapitiya previously said that he reserved symbols from IPOA through IPOZ.

In 2019, Palihapitiya helped take Virgin Galactic public through a SPAC, previously known as IPOA.

In March 2021, Palihapitiya sold his stake Virgin Galactic for around US$213 million. In February 2022, Palihapitiya stepped down as chairman of Virgin Galactic.

In 2020, Social Capital Hedosophia took Opendoor, an online real estate marketplace, public through a SPAC. OpenDoor raised $1 billion through the merger, $400 million of which came from the SPAC and an additional $600 million through PIPE investors. Palihapitiya accounted for $100 million of the PIPE.

In 2021, Palihapitiya announced he planned to help take SoFi, a financial services platform, and Clover Health, a Medicare insurance company, public through SPACs. This gained Palihapitiya criticism from the Financial Times, which said that he is "shilling risky reverse-mergers to retail investors on a almost bimonthly basis".

Following the Clover Health SPAC, Hindenburg Research, a financial analyst and short-selling specialist firm, issued a report about this transaction accusing Palihapitiya of luring investors into a “broken business”, argumenting that he failed to inform them about an active Department of Justice investigation into Clover's allegedly deceptive business practices. Palihapitiya made more than $290 million from the deal based on a $25k investment. In addition the Clover Health co-founder/CEO's previous company, CarePoint Health, a hospital conglomerate in New Jersey, was accused of price gouging customers and according to a NJ state commission siphoning off $150 million to himself and his friends bankrupting the company and causing a hospital crisis in NJ. Regulators in NJ called for an investigation of Clover Health because of the CEO's previous actions. The Securities and Exchange Commission opened an investigation into the allegations set forth in the Hindenburg Research report on February 4.

During the GameStop short squeeze, Palihapitiya repeatedly attacked Robinhood and its founders for being unethical by selling payment for order flow to HFT firms like Citadel Securities and pushed his fans to switch over to SoFi, which was merging with his SPAC yet failed to mention that SoFi employs the same practice of selling payment for order flow to HFT firms (including to Citadel Securities) and owns a 16% stake in Apex Clearing Corp, a clearing house involved in the controversy.

In April 2021, John Coates, acting director of the SEC's corporate-finance division, criticized Palihapitiya's views on the benefits of SPACs over traditional IPOs:

Coates clarified that a judge could rule a SPAC is similar enough to an IPO that the lesser securities law liability would be void.

In June 2021, Social Capital Survetta filed for four new SPACs, focusing on biotechnology companies, under the stock tickers DNAA through DNAD.

Political positions and activities

Palihapitiya has donated to the Democratic Party. As of February 2021, he has reportedly donated $1.3 million to the party over the past decade. He donated $7,500 to Republican Ted Cruz in 2011. In March 2020, Palihapitiya told The New York Times that he would like to see Michael Bloomberg at the top of the Democratic ticket in the 2020 Democratic Party presidential primaries, paired with Amy Klobuchar or Elizabeth Warren.

Immigration reform and policy advocacy
Palihapitiya was listed as one of the "Founders" of the lobbying group FWD.us. The group launched on 11 April 2013, and its goals include immigration reform, improving education, and enabling technological innovation, all in a United States context. An article in The New Republic stated that Palihapitiya received a weekly report about FWD.us and also quoted him as saying, in response to controversy around the FWD.us political lobbying strategy: "The folks that are actually people that run that day to day are sophisticated and understand the nuances of how to affect it... It's a really gnarly, gnarly thing having to deal with Washington. And to be honest with you, my perspective was, it's a really good investment because it's a good way to pay it forward, and I'm really glad there are other people other than me who are dealing with it who have the patience and resolve to figure it out."

San Francisco inequality and housing controversy
At Bloomberg's Next Big Thing conference in Sausalito, California, Palihapitiya made remarks critical of San Francisco's then mayor, Ed Lee, and proposed that the city provide subsidized housing to low-income residents funded by an equity tax on startups, with the tax-and-subsidy schemes potentially restricted to particular zones of the city. This led to a heated debate between Palihapitiya and super angel Ron Conway. Conway, a supporter of Lee, defended the city's policies, argued that things would get better for all residents, and noted that Palihapitiya lives in Palo Alto rather than in the city. In a later clarification to TechCrunch, Palihapitiya outlined his vision in more detail and described how his views on inequality and social mobility were shaped by his experience growing up with poor immigrant parents in Canada.

Criticism of Facebook and social media
In November 2017, Palihapitiya said that, for ethical reasons, he regretted helping Facebook to become the largest social media platform. He said,
The short-term, dopamine-driven feedback loops that we have created are destroying how society works: no civil discourse, no collaboration, misinformation, mistruth and it's not an American problem. This is not about Russian ads. This is a global problem. It is eroding the core foundations of how people behave by and between each other.
After criticism from Facebook for his remarks, Palihapitiya said,
I genuinely believe that Facebook is a force for good in the world, so I'd like to expand on my comments... My comments were meant to start an important conversation, not to criticize one company—particularly one I love. In 2017, many of us have grappled with the unintended consequences of the products we've built. Social media platforms in particular have been used and abused in ways that we, their architects, never imagined. Much blame has been thrown and guilt felt, but the important thing is what we as an industry do now to ensure that our impact on society continues to be a positive one.Palihapitiya, Chamath (December 15, 2017). (Untitled) . Facebook. (Account confirmed by Business Insider article.)
He reiterated this criticism in a podcast with Kara Swisher.

California gubernatorial campaign
On 25 January 2021, Palihapitiya announced he would challenge incumbent California Governor Gavin Newsom in the event Newsom was recalled. If elected, Palihapitiya said he would cut the state income tax rate from 16 to 0 percent, provide free education vouchers, allow for a two thousand dollar credit for every child born in California, and work to make California the center of climate and technology jobs. He shared a campaign website that was created by a supporter.

In February 2021, however, Palihapitiya declared he would not run for Governor.

Comments on Uyghur genocide
In January 2022, Palihapitiya said on the podcast All-In with Chamath, Jason, Sacks & Friedberg to co-host Jason Calacanis that the ongoing Uyghur genocide and internment of at least one million Uyghurs in concentration camps in Xinjiang, China does not concern him:
Nobody cares about what's happening to the Uyghurs, okay. You bring it up because you care and I think it's nice that you care. The rest of us don't care. I'm just telling you a very hard, ugly truth. Of all the things that I care about, yes, it is below my line.

Palihapitiya said he and most Americans care more about domestic economic issues than the human rights abuses of China's Uyghur minority. In response, the Golden State Warriors issued a statement saying that Palihapitiya "does not speak on behalf of our franchise, and his views certainly don't reflect those of our organization." Palihapitiya made further remarks in a tweet, saying that he recognized he came across as "lacking empathy" and that "To be clear, my belief is that human rights matter, whether in China, the United States, or elsewhere. Full stop."

Investments and philanthropy
During his time at Facebook, Palihapitiya invested in several startups through Embarcadero Ventures, a venture capital fund.

In 2010, Palihapitiya helped to buy the Golden State Warriors for $450 million; he remains a minority stakeholder and board member of the team. According to the team as of 2022 he was a "limited investor with no day-to-day operating functions". In 2022, Palihapitiya’s 10% stake in the team was worth $520 million - a 2000% return on his $25 million initial investment.

Palihapitiya has donated consistently to his alma mater, the University of Waterloo, including a $25 million donation towards the engineering department in 2018.

In 2021, he donated $7 million to provide clean drinking water to 1,000 families in California's central valley through a partnership with one2one, an American foundation and Source Global, the maker of solar-powered hydropanels that extract potable water from the air.

Personal life 
After graduating from college, Palihapitiya followed his future wife, Brigette Lau, to California. They had three children together, and divorced in 2018.

Palihapitiya now lives in California with Nathalie Dompe, an Italian pharmaceutical heiress, model, and CEO of Dompe Holdings, whom he started dating in 2018, and with whom he has one child.

In a December 2017 interview, Palihapitiya said that he keeps his children as far away from technology as possible, except for the occasional movie, explaining "I don't like this co-dependency of 'they need to rely on me, and when they can't, I feed them a device because that becomes a babysitter'."

Palihapitiya has three World Series of Poker (WSOP) and two World Poker Tour (WPT) cashes for a total of $175,801. In 2011, he finished 101st out of 6,865 entries in the World Series of Poker's Main Event.

Palihapitiya purchased a $75 million Bombardier Global 7500 in 2020.

See also
 List of University of Waterloo people

References

External links

 

1976 births
Living people
American billionaires
American people of Sri Lankan descent
American venture capitalists
Bank of Montreal people
Canadian expatriates in the United States
Canadian people of Sri Lankan descent
Lisgar Collegiate Institute alumni
Silicon Valley people
Sri Lankan emigrants to Canada
University of Waterloo alumni